30 Rojullo Preminchadam Ela also known by the initialism 30RPE is a 2021 Indian Telugu-language fantasy romance film directed by debutant Munna Dhulipudi, starring Pradeep Machiraju and Amritha Aiyer. Based on the theme of reincarnation and body swapping, the film marks Machiraju's debut in a lead role. The film was released on 29 January 2021 to mixed reviews.

Plot
In 1947, Abbayi Gaaru and Ammayi Gaaru want to get married, but Abbayi gets killed in a fistfight, and Ammayigaru commits suicide. They are born again as Arjun and Akshara. Both get admission to the same Engineering college in Vizag. For some strange reason, they hate each other from the first sight itself. But the fate brings them to the same location where Abbai Garu and Ammayi Garu died. Here's the twist: they find themselves in each other's bodies. Arjun enters into Akshara's body, Akshara in Arjun's body. When they ask a swami how they can be turned back into their normal selves, he asks them to come back after 30 days. However, if this information is divulged, the effect might be permanent.

The next 30 days they make each other look like fools in front of their family and friends, which eventually leads to Akshara trying to commit suicide in Arjun's body, which Arjun prevents, they both promise to mend their behavior.

They go to meet the swami, but are shocked to learn that he died. Upon enquiring his pupil for the solution, he tells them he needs 30 more days to prepare for a ritual. Meanwhile, the ritual success might depend on them falling in love.

After spending time in each other's lives, they start to like each other, but Arjun needs to fight a kickboxing match against his rival. Akshara, having no idea of how to kickbox eventually enters the bout to fulfill Arjun's dream, as she gets badly beaten in Arjun's body, they realise their feelings for each other and kiss. The process is reversed, allowing Arjun to fight against his rival and win.

Cast 
{{cast listing|
 Pradeep Machiraju in a dual role as Arjun and Abbayigaru
 Amritha Aiyer in a dual role as Akshara and Ammayigaru
 Subhalekha Sudhakar as Swamiji  
 Posani Krishna Murali as Posani Subba Rao, Akshara's father
Saranya Pradeep as Akshara's sister
 Hema as Arjun's mother
 Harsha Chemudu as Nagarjuna, Arjun's friend
Hyper Aadi as Arjun's friend
Bhadram as Bhadram, Arjun's friend
Sruthi as Mahalakshmi Akshara's friend
Sivannarayana Naripeddi as Arjun's father
Sameer Hasan as Arjun's coach
Sudha as Doctor
 Anasuya  in a special appearance in the song Wah Wah Mere Bawa 

 Production 
Amritha Aiyer was signed to play a role in the film after the director, Munna, saw a song from Padaiveeran. The film is produced by SV Babu who previously produced Keratam and Andamaina Manasulo. The film was shot in Rajahmundry and Kerala. The film was scheduled to release on Ugadi 2020, but was postponed due to the COVID-19 pandemic.

 Soundtrack 
The film's sound track consists of three songs which were released through Lahari Music label. The song "Neeli Neeli Aakasam" became one of the biggest hits in the Telugu music. It topped the Telugu music charts and also hyped the film's promotions during its pre-release period.

A reviewer of IndiaGlitz wrote that "Chandra Bose pens lines of Neeli Neeli Aakasam that are supple while being effective in being poetic.  At one level, they are old-school lines that are a fit case for a melodramatic picturization.  Sid Sriram, the playback singer of the season, is impressive and sublime. Sunitha's voice adds to the old-school vibes.  Anup Rubens, for once, turns into a hesitant Gopi Sundar. Anup Rubens is never tired of Anup Rubens things."

 Reception 

 Critical reception 
Thadhagath Pathi of The Times of India stated that "30 Rojullo Preminchatam Ela has its heart in the right place but with too many gaps in its narrative, an outdated storyline and predictable plot, it doesn't have enough in it to draw people to the theatres amid the pandemic. Alas, this dish has been ruined by putting in too many ingredients that don't work well together." Viswanath Vijayanagaram from The New Indian Express wrote that "The film is jarring on so many levels. A friendship song plays between the lead pair just a few minutes after they stopped quarrelling like incorrigible muppets. Viva Harsha, who is deliberately named Nagarjuna, keeps receiving racist 'jokes'. This film doesn't work even as a college campus story. The jokes are all very unfunny. TV show host-turned-actor Pradeep makes a damp squib of a debut, with his comic timing testing your patience. Amritha Aiyer has the potential to deliver a good performance, provided the script is good, which this one isn't. All told, the song Neeli Neeli Aakasam, which comes just a few minutes into the movie, is the film's only bright spot."

Another reviewer from The Hans India'' wrote that "The movie starts off well and the love story in the flashback scenes is showcased well. However, the director has failed to grab the attention in the present sequences. The major twist before the interval is not that interesting and even the second half is extremely boring and the sloppy narration will irritate the audience. Despite having some plus points like performances, music, and comedy, the forced emotions, slow-paced narration, and boring screenplay became the biggest minus points of the film. On the whole, '30 Rojullo Preminchadam Ela' is just an average film and can be watched once."

Box office 
The film collected a gross collection of ₹4 crore on its first day.

References

External links 
 

2020s Telugu-language films
2021 films
2021 romance films
Films postponed due to the COVID-19 pandemic
Films scored by Anoop Rubens
Indian romance films
Films about reincarnation
Films set in Visakhapatnam
Films shot in Visakhapatnam
Films set in Andhra Pradesh
Films shot in Andhra Pradesh
Indian fantasy drama films
2021 fantasy films